Lionel Roux (born 12 April 1973) is a former tennis player from France, who turned professional in 1991. He was French National Junior champion in 1991, but didn't win a tour-level title (singles or doubles) during his pro career. The right-hander reached his career-high singles ranking on the ATP Tour on 13 March 1995, when he became World No. 48. His best slam performance was reaching the 4th round of the 1998 Australian Open.

Roux has also made an appearance in the 2001 French comedy La Tour Montparnasse Infernale.

External links

 
 

1973 births
Living people
French male tennis players